Pierre Van Vien Nguyen is a Vietnamese Roman Catholic prelate, serving as Auxiliary Bishop of the Roman Catholic Diocese of Vinh, Titular Bishop of the Megalopolis in Proconsulari (Titular See) and Apostolic Administrator of the Roman Catholic Diocese of Hưng Hóa, Vietnam.

Early life and education 
Nguyen was born in Quảng Bình province, Vietnam on 8 January 1965. He served in the army as a mandatory service. He acquired a doctorate in economics from the University of Agronomy, Hue.

Priesthood 
On 3 October 1999, Nguyen was ordained a priest. After ordination he worked in Australia among Vietnamese immigrants. He acquired his doctorate in theology in Australia.

Episcopate 
Nguyen was appointed Auxiliary Bishop of the Roman Catholic Diocese of Vinh and Titular Bishop of the Megalopolis in Proconsulari (Titular See) on 15 June 2013 and consecrated as a bishop on 4 September 2013 by Bishop Paul Nguyễn Thái Hợp. He was appointed Apostolic Administrator of the Roman Catholic Diocese of Hưng Hóa on 29 August 2020

References 

1965 births
Vietnamese Roman Catholic bishops
Living people